Who Is That Mad Band? is the eighth studio album by The Process. Released in 2016, the album features many guest artists, including one of the final recordings of guitarist Dick Wagner, as well as appearances by dub music legend Adrian Sherwood, UK vocalist Ghetto Priest, former Asian Dub Foundation MC Lord Kimo, dub/blues artist Skip McDonald aka Little Axe, electronic music producer David Harrow and the voice of dub reggae legend Lee "Scratch" Perry.

Track listing

Personnel 
 David Asher - Vocals
 Garrick Owen - Guitar
 Seth Payton - Bass, guitar, keyboards, programming
 Bill Heffelfinger - Bassist and programmer
 Gabe Gonzalez - Drums

External links

2016 albums
The Process (band) albums